Washo  (or Washoe; endonym ) is an endangered Native American language isolate spoken by the Washo on the California–Nevada border in the drainages of the Truckee and Carson Rivers, especially around Lake Tahoe. While there are only 20 elderly native speakers of Washo, since 1994 there has been a small immersion school that has produced a number of moderately fluent younger speakers. The immersion school has since closed its doors and the language program now operates through the Cultural Resource Department for the Washoe Tribe. The language is still very much endangered; however, there has been a renaissance in the language revitalization movement as many of the students who attended the original immersion school have become teachers.

Ethnographic Washo speakers belonged to the Great Basin culture area and they were the only non-Numic group of that area. The language has borrowed from the neighboring Uto-Aztecan, Maiduan and Miwokan languages and is connected to both the Great Basin and Northern California sprachbunds.

Regional variation

Washo shows very little geographic variation. Jacobsen (1986:108) wrote, "When there are two variants of a feature, generally one is found in a more northerly area and the other in a more southerly one, but the lines separating the two areas for the different features do not always coincide."

Genetic relations

Washo is conservatively considered a language isolate. That is, it shares no demonstrated link with any other language, including its three direct neighboring languages, Northern Paiute (a Numic language of Uto-Aztecan), Maidu (Maiduan), and Sierra Miwok (Utian).  It is often classified as a Hokan language, but this language family is not universally accepted among specialists, nor is Washo's connection to it.

The language was first described in A Grammar of the Washo Language by William H. Jacobsen, Jr., in a University of California, Berkeley, PhD dissertation and this remains the sole complete description of the language.  There is no significant dialect variation. (Jacobsen's lifelong work with Washo is described at the University of Nevada Oral History Program.)

Phonology

Vowels
There are six distinct vowel qualities found in the Washo language, each of which occurs long and short. The sound quality of a vowel is dependent upon their length and the consonant they precede, as well as the stress put on the vowel.

Vowels marked with the acute accent ( ´ ) are pronounced with stress, such as in the Washo ćigábut (summer).

In Washo, vowels can have either long or short length qualities; the longer quality is noted by appending a colon  to the vowel, as in the above example míši milí꞉giyi. Vowels with such a mark are usually pronounced for twice the normal length. This can be seen in the difference between the words móko (shoes) mó꞉ko (knee). However, vowels pronounced this way may not always be followed by a colon.

Jacobsen described in detail various vowel alternations that distinguished the Washo speech communities.

Consonants
Sequences not represented by a single letter in Washo almost always tend to occur in borrowed English words, such as the nd in kꞌindí (candy).

In the area around Woodfords, California, the local Washo dialect substituted [θ] for /s/, thus, sí꞉su 'bird' was written thithu.

Morphology

Washo has a complex tense system.

Washo uses partial or total reduplication of verbs or nouns to indicate repetitive aspect or plural number. Washo uses both prefixation and suffixation on nouns and verbs.

Verbs

Verbal inflection is rich with a large number of tenses. Tense is usually carried by a suffix that attaches to the verb. The tense suffix may signal recent past, intermediate past, the long-ago-but-remembered past, the distant past, the intermediate future, or the distant future. For example, the suffix -leg indicates that the verb describes an event that took place in the recent past, usually earlier the previous day as seen in the Washo sentence, "dabóʔo lew búʔlegi" (the white man fed us).

Nouns

Possession in Washo is shown by prefixes added to the object. There are two sets of prefixes added: the first set if the object begins with a vowel and the second set if the object begins with a consonant.

History 
In 2012, Lakeview Commons Park in South Lake Tahoe was renamed in the Washo language. "The Washoe Tribe has presented the name Tahnu Leweh (pronounced approx. ) which, in native language, means "all the people's place." It is a name the Tribe would like to gift to El Dorado County and South Lake Tahoe as a symbol of peace, prosperity and goodness."

See also

 Washoe tribe
 Native American languages

References

Sources
 Bright, William O. "North American Indian Languages." Encyclopædia Britannica 2007: 762-767.
 Campbell, Lyle. (1997). American Indian languages: The historical linguistics of Native America. New York: Oxford University Press. .
 d'Azevedo, Warren L. (1986). "Washoe" in Great Basin, Warren L. d'Azevedo, ed. pp. 466–498. Volume 11 in Handbook of North American Indians, William C. Sturtevant, general editor. Washington, DC: Smithsonian Institution. /0160045754.
 Goddard, Ives (Ed.). (1996). Languages. Handbook of North American Indians (W. C. Sturtevant, General Ed.) (Vol. 17). Washington, D. C.: Smithsonian Institution. .
 Greenberg, Joseph H. Language in the Americas (Stanford: Stanford University Press, 1987).

 Jacobsen, William H. (1986). "Washoe Language" in Great Basin, Warren L. d'Azevedo, ed. pp. 107–112. Volume 11 in Handbook of North American Indians, William C. Sturtevant, general editor. Washington, DC: Smithsonian Institution. /0160045754.
 Jacobsen, William H. 1996. Beginning Washo. Occasional Papers 5: Nevada State Museum.
 Kaufman, Terrence. 1988. "A Research Program for Reconstructing Proto-Hokan: First Gropings." In Scott DeLancey, ed. Papers from the 1988 Hokan–Penutian Languages Workshop, pp. 50–168. Eugene, Oregon: Department of Linguistics, University of Oregon. (University of Oregon Papers in Linguistics. Publications of the Center for Amerindian Linguistics and Ethnography 1.)
 Mithun, Marianne. (1999). The languages of Native North America. Cambridge: Cambridge University Press.  (hbk); .
 The Washo Project. The University of Chicago, 2008. Web. 4 May 2011
 Yu, Alan C. L. "Quantity, stress and reduplication in Washo." Phonology 22.03 (2006): 437.

Further reading 
 Dangberg, Grace. 1927. Washo texts. University of California Publications in American Archaeology and Ethnology 22:391-443.
 Kroeber, Alfred L. 1907. The Washo language of east central California and Nevada. University of California Publications in American Archaeology and Ethnology 4:251-317.

External links

 University of Chicago Washo Revitalization Project
 Washo Online Lexicon
 Reno Linguist Foremost Expert on Washoe Language
 Washo basic lexicon at the Global Lexicostatistical Database
 Washo language overview at the Survey of California and Other Indian Languages
 OLAC resources in and about the Washo language

Language isolates of North America
Indigenous languages of Nevada
Indigenous languages of California
Endangered languages of the United States
Indigenous languages of the North American Great Basin
Hokan languages
Endangered indigenous languages of the Americas
Washoe tribe
Endangered language isolates
Native American language revitalization